Jovan Kovačević (born 14 September 1970) is a Serbian former handball player.

Club career
Kovačević started out at his hometown club Vrbas. He would spend two seasons with Partizan between 1993 and 1995, winning back-to-back championships.

In 1997, Kovačević moved abroad to Spain and signed with Bidasoa. He also played for fellow Liga ASOBAL team Cangas, before moving to Germany in 1999.

After spending three seasons at SG Hameln, Kovačević was signed by Swiss club Grasshoppers in 2002. He moved to Italian side Torggler Group Meran in 2003.

International career
At international level, Kovačević competed for FR Yugoslavia in four major tournaments, winning the bronze medal at the 1996 European Championship.

Honours
Partizan
 Handball Championship of FR Yugoslavia: 1993–94, 1994–95
 Handball Cup of FR Yugoslavia: 1993–94

References

External links
 

1970 births
Living people
People from Vrbas, Serbia
Yugoslav male handball players
Serbia and Montenegro male handball players
Serbian male handball players
RK Vrbas players
RK Partizan players
Liga ASOBAL players
Handball-Bundesliga players
Expatriate handball players
Serbia and Montenegro expatriate sportspeople in Spain
Serbia and Montenegro expatriate sportspeople in Germany
Serbia and Montenegro expatriate sportspeople in Switzerland
Serbia and Montenegro expatriate sportspeople in Italy